Maria Angelita Ressa (born Maria Angelita Delfin Aycardo on October 2, 1963) is a Filipino-American journalist and Nobel Peace laureate. She is the co-founder and CEO of Rappler. She previously spent nearly two decades working as a lead investigative reporter in Southeast Asia for CNN.

Ressa was born in Manila and raised in Toms River, New Jersey. She was included in Time Person of the Year 2018 issue featuring a collection of journalists from around the world actively combating fake news. On February 13, 2019, she was arrested by Philippine authorities for cyberlibel due to accusations that Rappler published a false news story concerning businessman Wilfredo Keng. On June 15, 2020, a court in Manila found her guilty of cyberlibel under the controversial Anti-Cybercrime law, a move condemned by human rights groups and journalists as an attack on press freedom. As she is a prominent critic of the then Philippine President Rodrigo Duterte, her arrest and conviction was seen by many in the opposition and the international community as a politically motivated act by Duterte's government. Ressa is one of the 25 leading figures on the Information and Democracy Commission launched by Reporters Without Borders. She was awarded the 2021 Nobel Peace Prize jointly with Dmitry Muratov for "their efforts to safeguard freedom of expression, which is a precondition for democracy and lasting peace."

Early life 
Ressa was born in Manila in October 1963. Ressa's father Phil Sunico Aycardo, a Chinese-Filipino, died when she was one year old. She grew up speaking only Tagalog and studied at St. Scholastica's College in Manila. Her mother Hermelina then moved to the United States, leaving Ressa and her sister with their father's family, but would visit her two children frequently. Subsequently, her mother married an Italian-American man named Peter Ames Ressa and returned to the Philippines. She brought both of her children to New Jersey, United States when Ressa was ten years old. Ressa was adopted by her stepfather and she took his last name. Her parents then relocated to Toms River, New Jersey, where she went to Toms River High School North, a public school nearby. Ressa had to learn the English language, and by high school stood out as a member of the Theater Guild and student council. She explained her experience thus:I landed in New Jersey, where I could barely speak English, and I had to figure out what a short brown kid was going to do in this big white world.

Her yearbook profile included her dreams to set out and conquer the world. Ressa was an undergraduate student at Princeton University, where she graduated cum laude with an A.B. in English and certificates in theater and dance in 1986. She completed a 77-page-long senior thesis titled "Sagittarius." She then was awarded a Fulbright Fellowship to study political theater at the University of the Philippines Diliman where she also taught several journalism courses as a faculty member in the university.

Career 

Ressa's first job was at government station PTV 4. She then co-founded independent production company Probe in 1987, and simultaneously served as CNN's bureau chief in Manila until 1995. She then ran CNN's Jakarta bureau from 1995 to 2005. As CNN's lead investigative reporter in Asia, she specialized in investigating terrorist networks. She became an author-in-residence at the International Center for Political Violence and Terrorism Research (ICPVTR) of Nanyang Technological University's S. Rajaratnam School of International Studies in Singapore.

From 2004, Ressa headed the news division of ABS-CBN, while also writing for CNN, and The Wall Street Journal. In September 2010, she wrote a piece for The Wall Street Journal criticising the then president Beningno Aquino III handling of the bus hostage crisis. This piece was published two weeks before the president's official visit to the United States of America. Speculations were rife that this, among other reasons, finally led to Ressa leaving the company in 2010, after deciding not to renew her contract.

Ressa is a fellow at the Initiative on the Digital Economy at the Massachusetts Institute of Technology and
is a 2021 Joan Shorenstein Fellow at the Shorenstein Center on Media, Politics and Public Policy and Hauser Leader at the Center for Public Leadership at Harvard Kennedy School.

Books 
She is the author of three books concerning the rise of terrorism in Southeast Asia—Seeds of Terror: An Eyewitness Account of Al-Qaeda's Newest Center (2003) and From Bin Laden to Facebook: 10 Days of Abduction, 10 Years of Terrorism (2013). and 
How to Stand Up To a Dictator (2022)last=Ressa |first = Maria|publisher HarperCollins isbn 978-
0063257511 location New York New York

Teaching 
Ressa has also taught courses in politics and the press in Southeast Asia for Princeton University, and broadcast journalism for the University of the Philippines Diliman.

Rappler 
Ressa established the online news site Rappler in 2012 along with three other female founders and with a small team of 12 journalists and developers. It initially started as a Facebook page named MovePH in August 2011, evolving into a complete website on January 1, 2012. The site became one of the first multimedia news websites in the Philippines and a major news portal in the Philippines, receiving numerous local and international awards. She serves as the Executive Editor and Chief Executive Officer of the news website.

"Real Content Oversight Board"
On September 25, 2020, Ressa became one the 25 members of the "Real Facebook Oversight Board," an independent watchdog group established to provide public commentary on Facebook's content moderation policies and role in civic life.

Issue One – Council for Responsible Social Media
In October 2022, Ressa joined the Council for Responsible Social Media project launched by Issue One to address the negative mental, civic, and public health impacts of social media in the United States co-chaired by former House Democratic Caucus Leader Dick Gephardt and former Massachusetts Lieutenant Governor Kerry Healey.

Legal issues

Ressa first interviewed Rodrigo Duterte, the 16th president of the Philippines, in the 1980s when he was mayor of Davao. She again interviewed him in 2015 during his presidential election campaign, where he confessed to killing three people when he was mayor. Under her leadership, Rappler has been consistently critical of Duterte's policies, especially his policies on the war on drugs with their stories demonstrating that the abuses were being carried out by the police with Duterte's approval. The website under her stewardship also wrote about the alleged pro-Duterte online "troll army" which according to their article, were pushing out fake news stories and manipulating the narrative around his presidency.

In July 2017, in his State of the Nation Address, Duterte declared Rappler to be "fully owned" by the Americans and hence in violation of the constitution. He also said, "Not only is Rappler's news fake, it being Filipino is also fake." Subsequently, in August 2017, the Philippine securities and exchange commission (SEC) initiated an investigation against Rappler and demanded to check its documents. In January 2018, it revoked Rappler's license to do business. The case went to the court of appeals, where it was remanded back to the SEC for having no basis. Duterte told a Rappler reporter in 2018: "If you are trying to throw garbage at us, then the least that we can do is explain – how about you? Are you also clean?" The government under his leadership revoked the site's operating license.

Arrest and conviction 

On January 22, 2018, Ressa appeared before the Philippines' National Bureau of Investigation (NBI), to comply with a subpoena over an online libel complaint under the Cybercrime Prevention Act of 2012, which the administration of Rodrigo Duterte has wielded to punish criticism of the President and his allies. The subpoena was issued on January 10 to Ressa, together with former Rappler reporter Reynaldo Santos, and businessman Benjamin Bitanga. The subpoena was filed in October 2017 by a Filipino–Chinese national, Wilfredo Keng, after Rappler published a story on Keng's alleged lending of his sports utility vehicle to now-deceased Chief Justice Renato Corona as a bribed form of favor. Though the article was written in 2012 before the act criminalizing cyberlibel was signed into law by Benigno Aquino III, the Department of Justice considered it republished after a typographical error was corrected in 2014. In 2019, human rights lawyers Amal Clooney, Caoilfhionn Gallagher, and Can Yeginsu joined the legal team (consisting of international and Filipino lawyers) defending Ressa. The Free Legal Assistance Group (FLAG), which is the main human rights law firm in the Philippines, led by Atty. Theodore O. "Ted" Te, managed the legal team of Ressa during her different cases.

In November 2018, the Philippine government announced that it would charge Ressa and Rappler's parent company, Rappler Holdings Corporation, with tax evasion and failure to file tax returns. The charge concerns the investment in Rappler by the Omidyar Network in 2015. Ressa has denied wrongdoing, originally stating that the foreign money was "donated" to its managers, later stating the investments were in the form of securities. Rappler issued a statement denying any wrongdoing. The Philippines' Bureau of Internal Revenue, after a study of Ressa's explanation, ruled that Rappler's issuance of securities-generated capital gains was taxable. It concluded that Rappler evaded payment amounting to ₱133million in taxes. 

On February 13, 2019, Philippine judge Rainelda Estacio-Montesa of the Manila Regional Trial Court Branch #46 issued the arrest warrant for "cyber libel" against Ressa for an article published on Rappler. The officials of the Philippines National Bureau of Investigation fulfilled this warrant filed under the charge of cyber libel. The "cyber libel" law was passed after the article was originally published, so the charge was based on the technicality that fixing a typo might be considered "republishing". The arrest was live-streamed by many of Rappler's senior reporters on Facebook.

Due to time constraints, Ressa was unable to post bail amounting to ₱60,000 ($1,150) resulting in her arrest and confinement within the (holding) board room office of the NBI building. A total of six lawyers, two pro bono, were assigned to work on her case. On February 14, 2019, at the executor proceeding of Manila city Judge Maria Teresa Abadilla, Ressa gained freedom by posting bail at ₱100,000 ($1,900).

Ressa's arrest was criticized by the international community. As Ressa is an outspoken critic of President Rodrigo Duterte, many viewed the arrest as being politically motivated. In contrast, the official spokesperson for the Malacañang Palace denied any government involvement in the arrest, asserting that the lawsuit against Ressa was set forth by a private individual, the plaintiff Wilfredo Keng.

Madeleine Albright, a former U.S. Secretary of State, issued an opinion stating that the arrest "must be condemned by all democratic nations". Similarly, the National Union of Journalists of the Philippines called it "a shameless act of persecution by a bully government".

The National Press Club, an organization accused of having close ties to the Duterte regime and with a long history of criticizing the Rappler organization, has stated that the arrest was not harassment, and that Ressa should not be relegated to "the altar of press freedom for martyrdom". It also warned against politicizing the issue.

Ressa's trial on charges of cyberlibel began in July 2019. In a statement she made on the first day of her trial, Ressa said: "This case of cyberlibel stretches the rule of law until it breaks."

Ressa was found guilty on June 15, 2020. In her ruling, Judge Rainelda Estacio-Montesa argued that Rappler "did not offer a scintilla of proof that they verified the imputations of various crimes in the disputed article... They just simply published them as news in their online publication in reckless disregard of whether they are false or not." Judge Rainelda Estacio-Montesa also quoted Nelson Mandela, saying, "To be free is not merely to cast off one's chains but to live in a way that respects and enhances the freedom of others." Sheila Coronel, director of the Stabile Center for Investigative Journalism at Columbia University, argued that the conviction is representative of "how democracy dies in the 21st century."

Ressa faces between six months and six years in prison and a fine of ₱400,000 ($8,000). Ressa warned that her conviction could augur the end of freedom of the press in the Philippines. Presidential Spokesperson Harry Roque asked the media to "respect the decision" and said President Rodrigo Duterte was still committed to free speech, while Vice President Leni Robredo described the conviction as a "chilling development" and the National Union of Journalists of the Philippines said it "basically kills freedom of speech and of the press." Internationally the ruling has been criticized by Human Rights Watch, Amnesty International, and Reporters Without Borders. In its statement condemning the sentence, Reporters Without Borders described the legal proceedings against Ressa as "Kafkaesque".

On January 15, 2023, 12 Nobel Peace Prize laureates, including all of the 2022 laureates and her fellow 2021 Nobel Peace Prize winner Dmitri Muratov, issued an open letter to President Marcos implored him to “assist in bringing about a rapid resolution to the unjust charges against Maria Ressa and Rappler.” 

In January 2023, a Philippine court acquitted Ressa and Rappler of tax evasion, stemming from the 2018 case. The Philippine Court of Tax Appeals acquitted Ressa and Rappler of four tax charges, while a fifth tax case remains pending at the Pasig Regional Trial Court. Rappler executive editor Glenda Gloria was also charged for the case at the Pasig court.

Awards and recognition 

Ressa has won an Emmy nomination for Outstanding Investigative Journalism, the Asian Television Awards, TOWNS – Ten Outstanding Women in the Nation's Service (Philippines) and TOYM Philippines.
 In 2010, Esquire proclaimed Ressa the Philippines' "sexiest woman alive", explaining: "Despite her size, fearless enough to write an eyewitness account of Al-Qaeda".
 In 2015, the Philippine Movie Press Club awarded Ressa with an Excellence in Broadcasting Lifetime Achievement award at the 29th PMPC Star Awards for Television.
 In 2016, she was listed as one of the eight most influential and powerful leaders in the Philippines by Kalibrr.
 In November 2017, Ressa, as the CEO of news organization Rappler, accepted the 2017 Democracy Award awarded by the National Democratic Institute to three organizations at its annual Democracy Award Dinner in Washington, D.C., entitled "Disinformation vs. Democracy: Fighting for Facts".
 In May 2018, Ressa received the Knight International Journalism Awards, where she was described as "an intrepid editor and media innovator who holds a spotlight to the Philippine government’s bloody war on drugs."
 In June 2018, Ressa received the World Association of Newspapers's Golden Pen of Freedom Award for her work with Rappler.
 In November 2018, the Committee to Protect Journalists awarded Ressa with the Gwen Ifill Press Freedom Award in "recognition of her journalistic courage in the face of persistent official harassment."
 In December 2018, she was included in Times Person of the Year 2018, as one of "The Guardians", a number of journalists from around the world combating the "War on Truth". Ressa is the second Filipino to receive the title after former President Corazon Aquino in 1986.
 In February 2019, Ressa received the Ka Pepe Diokno Human Rights Award together with Bishop Pablo Virgilio Ambo David from the De La Salle University Tañada-Diokno College of Law and the Jose W. Diokno Foundation, as presented by Dean Chel Diokno.
 In April 2019, she was included in Times 100 Most Influential People in the World.
 In May 2019, Ressa won the Columbia Journalism Award from the Columbia University Graduate School of Journalism, the school's highest honor, "for the depth and quality of her work, as well as her courage and persistence in the field."
 In June 2019, Ressa received the Canadian Journalism Foundation's Tribute honour, which recognizes a journalist who has made an impact on the international stage.
 In October 2019, Ressa was named on the BBC's list of 100 Women.
 In April 2021, Ressa won the UNESCO/Guillermo Cano World Press Freedom Prize.
 In November, 2022 Ressa received an honorary degree from MacEwan University in Edmonton, AB, Canada.

Nobel Peace Prize

Ressa was nominated for the 2021 Nobel Peace Prize by prime minister and leader of the Norwegian Labour Party Jonas Gahr Støre. On October 8, 2021, Ressa was officially announced as the recipient of the prize alongside Dmitry Muratov of the Russian Federation. They were awarded the prize "for their efforts to safeguard freedom of expression, which is a precondition for democracy and lasting peace". Ressa and Muratov are the first journalists since 1935 to receive the Nobel Peace Prize.

Personal life
Ressa is openly lesbian.

Published works

See also
 Cybercrime Prevention Act of 2012 – the rule applied in the aforementioned case
 List of Nobel laureates affiliated with Princeton University
 List of Filipino Nobel laureates and nominees
 List of Nobel laureates
 We Hold the Line, a 2020 documentary film about the Philippine drug war and corruption, repression and violence under the regime of Philippine president Rodrigo Duterte, featuring Ressa and her journalistic work and struggles in the Philippines.
 A Thousand Cuts, a 2020 documentary film about Ressa and her journalistic work and struggles in the Philippines.

References

External links

 
 
 
 

1963 births
Living people
ABS-CBN News and Current Affairs people
American Nobel laureates
American online journalists
American women journalists of Asian descent
BBC 100 Women
CNN people
Filipino dissidents
Filipino Nobel laureates
Filipino non-fiction writers
Filipino online journalists
Filipino women journalists
Harvard University people
Academic staff of Nanyang Technological University
Nobel Peace Prize laureates
People convicted of speech crimes
People from Toms River, New Jersey
Princeton University alumni
Princeton University faculty
Toms River High School North alumni
University of the Philippines Diliman alumni
Academic staff of the University of the Philippines Diliman
Women Nobel laureates
Fulbright alumni
Filipino LGBT journalists
American LGBT journalists
Filipino lesbian writers
American lesbian writers
Lesbian journalists